Mina Fossati is a collaborative album by Italian singers Mina and Ivano Fossati, released on 22 November 2019 by PDU and Il Volatore and distributed by Sony Music.

Overview
Mina and Fossati decided to record a joint album back in 1997, they even met then and discussed the concept, but record labels were not enthusiastic about this venture and the project had to be shelved.

Nevertheless, twenty years later, Mina confessed to Fossati that she was still not against a joint record. Fossati himself released the last album in 2011, considering it formally the last, which is why he was somewhat hesitant to agree to this work. Nevertheless, he agreed and wrote lyrics and music for almost two years. He submitted twelve original songs, eleven of which were recorded, and another was rejected by Mina because she considered it "too sweet" for the album.

The record was released on November 22, 2019 in various formats, including digital, CD, vinyl and box set. The album peaked at number two in Italy and number 26 in Switzerland. In 2020, the album was certified platinum in Italy.

Track listing

Personnel

Charts

Weekly charts

Year-end charts

Certifications and sales

References

2019 albums
Mina (Italian singer) albums
Collaborative albums
Sony Music albums